Orthotylus salsolae is a species of bug from the Miridae family that can be found in France, Spain, and the island of Sicily.

References

Insects described in 1875
Hemiptera of Europe
salsolae